Masanori Taguchi (田口 昌徳, born 26 August 1970) is a former Nippon Professional Baseball catcher.

References

External links

1970 births
Living people
Baseball people from Ibaraki Prefecture
Komazawa University alumni
Japanese baseball players
Nippon Professional Baseball catchers
Nippon Ham Fighters players
Fukuoka Daiei Hawks players
Fukuoka SoftBank Hawks players
Japanese baseball coaches
Nippon Professional Baseball coaches